"Born to Be Alive" is a song written by French singer Patrick Hernandez. It became a worldwide hit and reached #1 on the US Disco chart in spring 1979. It was first conceived as a hard rock song.

The song achieved gold status in the USA.

Charts

Weekly charts

Original version

Born to Be Alive (re-mix '88)

Year-end charts

Certifications and sales

Cover versions and uses
Disco Kings covered the song in 2005. Their version reached #7 in Finland, #43 in France, #66 in Austria and #78 in Germany. A music video set to the song using footage from Adolf Hitler's many rallies and speeches became a viral hit on the Internet.

A cover version performed by the Chinese singer Jackson Wang appeared on the 2022 album Minions: The Rise of Gru, the soundtrack album to the film of the same name.

The song's music was used by the Indian film composers Jatin–Lalit for the song "Pehli Pehli Baar Jab" from the 1998 movie Jab Pyaar Kisise Hota Hai.

The song is featured in the opening hockey brawl scene of “Hockey Brings People Together”, the fifth episode of Season 1 of the Hulu series  Shoresy.

See also

List of best-selling singles in France
List of number-one singles in Australia during the 1970s
List of number-one singles of 1979 (Canada)
List of number-one singles of 1979 (France)
List of number-one hits of 1979 (Germany)
List of number-one hits (Italy)
List of number-one hits of 1979 (Mexico)
List of number-one singles in 1979 (New Zealand)
List of number-one songs in Norway
List of RPM number-one dance singles of 1979
List of number-one singles of 1979 (Spain)
List of number-one singles and albums in Sweden
List of number-one dance singles of 1979 (U.S.)

References

1979 songs
1979 singles
1988 singles
Disco songs
Number-one singles in Australia
Number-one singles in Austria
Number-one singles in Belgium
Number-one singles in Denmark
Number-one singles in France
Number-one singles in Germany
Number-one singles in Italy
Number-one singles in Mexico
Number-one singles in New Zealand
Number-one singles in Norway
Number-one singles in Spain
Number-one singles in Sweden
RPM Top Singles number-one singles